Hawsh al-Farah (also spelled Hosh Elfara) is a Syrian village located in Markaz Rif Dimashq, Douma District. Hawsh al-Farah had a population of 2,451 in the 2004 census.

References

Populated places in Douma District